Tasso Ribeiro Jereissati (born 15 December 1948) is federal senator of Brazil. He is a former governor of Ceará from 1987 to 1991 and again from 1995 to 2002. He was formerly president of the Teotônio Vilela Institute, a PSDB-affiliated think tank.

References

Official page at the Brazilian Senate

1948 births
Living people
People from Fortaleza
Members of the Federal Senate (Brazil)
Governors of Ceará
Brazilian people of Arab descent
Brazilian Social Democracy Party politicians
Brazilian people of Lebanese descent